The Bingo Shooting Device is a small mousetrap-like device used in novelty pranks and magic tricks. The device, invented by Sam S. Adams for S.S. Adams Novelties in 1907, consists of a hinge that is closed over a spring-loaded hammer. When the hinge is allowed to open, the hammer is released and strikes a percussion cap, causing a loud bang. The mechanism has been adapted to many prank items, including pens that explode when the cap is removed and toilet seats that explode when raised.

References 

Magic tricks
Practical joke devices